Corfinium was a city in ancient Italy, on the eastern side of the Apennines, due east of Rome, near modern Corfinio, in the province of L'Aquila (Abruzzo region).

History

Corfinium was the chief city of the Paeligni, situated in the valley of the Aternus, near the point where that river's course suddenly makes a sharp turn and runs from southeasterly to northeasterly on towards the Adriatic Sea. It was distant 7 miles from Sulmo (modern Sulmona), and 30 from Alba Fucens by the Via Valeria. There can be no doubt that Corfinium was from an early period the capital city of the Paeligni, and one of the chief towns in this part of Italy; but no mention of its name is found in history until the outbreak of the Social War, in 90 BCE, when it was selected by the confederates to be their common capital, and the seat of their government. It was probably to the importance of its situation in a military point of view that it was mainly indebted for this distinction; but the allied nations seem to have destined it to be the permanent capital of Italy, and the rival of Rome, as they changed its name to Italica, and adorned it with a new and spacious forum and senate house, and other public buildings of a style corresponding to its intended greatness. But before the end of the second year of the war they were compelled to abandon their new capital, and transfer the seat of government to Aesernia (modern Isernia). The fate of Corfinium after this is not mentioned, but it probably fell into the hands of the Romans without resistance, and in consequence did not suffer; for we find it at the outbreak of the Civil War between Julius Caesar and Pompey, 49 BCE, still retaining its position as a city of importance and a strong fortress. On this account it was occupied by L. Domitius with 31 cohorts, and was the only place which offered any effectual resistance to the arms of Caesar during his advance through Italy. Nor was it reduced by force, but the disaffection which rapidly spread among his officers compelled Domitius to surrender after a siege of only seven days. Along with the garrison, several important Republican personages were also captured; Caesar released these after obtaining their oaths of loyalty, oaths many promptly broke.

A part of the territory of Corfinium had been portioned out to new settlers as early as the time of the Gracchi: it received a fresh body of colonists under Augustus, but never assumed the title of a colony, all inscriptions giving it that of a municipium only. It still appears in the Itineraries as a place of importance, and even seems to have been in the fourth century regarded as the capital of the province of Valeria, and the residence of its Praeses or governor. The period of its destruction is unknown, but it seems to have been still in existence as late as the tenth century.

Archaeology
Ruins of Corfinium have been found around the modern town of Corfinio, known as Pentima in the Roman period, then medieval Valva (the adjoining valley is still called La Pianata di Valva). It re-took the ancient name in 1928. The bridge over the Aternus,  from the city, is mentioned both by Caesar and Strabo, and must always have been a military point of the highest importance. Hence Domitius committed a capital error in neglecting to occupy it in sufficient force when Caesar was advancing upon Corfinium. This bridge must evidently be the same, close to which the modern town of Popoli has grown up; leading to the erroneous supposition by some authors that Popoli, rather than San Pelino, occupies the site of Corfinium.

References

Further reading

Roman sites of Abruzzo
Corfinio